Gedania may refer to

 Gdańsk or Gedania (Latin), Poland
 Energa Gedania Gdańsk, a women's volleyball team in Gdańsk
 Gedania Danzig, an ethnically Polish football team (1922–1939)
 Gedania 1922 Gdańsk, a men's football team in Gdańsk, formed in 1945 it is the successor of Gedania Danzig.
 764 Gedania, a minor planet orbiting the Sun
 Gedania (supply ship)